Gentlemen & Players is a novel by Joanne Harris first published in 2005. A dark psychological thriller, some of the themes may be partly based on Harris' experiences as a teacher at Leeds Grammar School. Set in the present day during Michaelmas term at St Oswald's, a grammar school for boys somewhere in the North of England, the book is a psychological thriller about class distinctions, damaged childhood, secrets, identity and revenge.

Plot introduction
St Oswald's is a long-established boys' grammar school in the North of England. A new academic year has just begun and change is afoot. Roy Straitley, the Classics master and a veteran of St Oswald's, is contemplating retirement. Increased paperwork, computers, Health & Safety and a new generation of administrators have finally persuaded him that he no longer has a place in the world of education. However, St Oswald's is about to suffer a cataclysmic upheaval.

It begins with a series of small acts of mischief conducted by someone on school premises. At first, no one thinks of connecting these seemingly isolated incidents. But gradually, as the incidents become increasingly serious, it becomes clear that someone with inside knowledge is intent on causing real damage. Only Mr Straitley may have the key to the identity of the mysterious saboteur - but can he expose the enemy in time to prevent a murder?

Plot summary

As the new school year starts in September, Roy Straitley is looking forward to his 100th term at St Oswald's, where he has been teaching for 33 years. Having never married, he lives alone and has devoted his life to his career. His sitting room walls are full of pictures of "his boys", and St Oswald's represents his only family. He is slightly overweight and ugly by conventional standards (his nickname among his pupils is "Quaz", short for "Quasimodo"). Popular with the students, he adheres to the old principle of being "firm but fair" where teaching and disciplinary matters are concerned. An incurable optimist, Straitley is only uncomfortable when he has to deal with the opposite sex. He is a keen observer, and hardly anything connected with life at the school, however insignificant, ever escapes his notice. A firm believer in the advantages and importance of a classical education, he shuns computers, resorts to Latin to swear and insult his colleagues (which they do not understand), and opposes the idea of any competition between schools other than the kind which is carried out on the playing fields. Smoking Gauloises in his empty form room is his "one concession to the influence of the Modern Languages", and there is long-standing enmity between Straitley and Dr Devine, the Head of German.

The other masters are mostly set in their ways, St Oswald's having made an indelible imprint on their lives. There is Pat Bishop, the Second Master, who has also remained unmarried and who occasionally, at busy times, spends the night in his office doing administrative work. Always intent on mediating between rivalling factions, Bishop has been able to keep his affair with his secretary a secret so as not to blemish the school's reputation. There is Bob Strange, the Third Master, a bureaucrat unpopular with the pupils who has been trying for years to get rid of Straitley and force him into early retirement ("Young blood is cheaper."). There are the members of the German department ("Teutons", according to the old Latin master), among them Geoff and Penny ("League of") Nations, a married couple described by Straitley as hypocrites and sycophants. There is Tony Beard, head of computer science and eo ipso Straitley's natural adversary. And there is Isabelle Tapi, a part-time French teacher who is said to have made passes at each new male addition to the staff.

At the beginning of the new term, it is the "freshers" on whom Straitley focuses his observations. There are five of them, among them Jeff Light, a Games master who has become a teacher because he thinks it is an easy job; Chris Keane, who teaches English but actually wants to be a novelist; and Dianne Dare, an attractive young woman who teaches French.

The new term starts with a number of minor yet inexplicable occurrences. For the first time in his life, Straitley's register goes missing without ever turning up again. Also, his coffee mug is no longer at the place in the Common Room where it has sat for many years. Pupils report that various objects are missing from their classrooms or lockers. In particular, a 13-year-old Jewish boy from Straitley's form deplores the alleged theft of his expensive fountain pen, a Bar Mitzvah present. Presently, the boy's mother accuses the school and especially Straitley of anti-Semitism. Soon afterwards, a pupil in Straitley's class nearly dies, following another malicious trick, and closely guarded secrets in the lives of the St Oswald's staff are anonymously revealed. Life at St Oswald's begins to suffer a gradual disintegration. One morning, after the discovery of a computer virus on the school's computer system, Pat Bishop is arrested, because child pornography has been downloaded onto his computer and paid for with his credit card. Bishop denies this, but the damage to his career has been done. Meanwhile, a mysterious figure called "Mole" publishes in the local newspaper damaging allegations about St Oswald's.

Straitley begins to suspect that, not only are all these incidents orchestrated by the same malicious individual, but that this person is deliberately trying to bring down St. Oswald's.

The novel is written using Harris' typical split-narrative technique. The first narrator (indicated at the beginning of each chapter by a white King) is Straitley himself, and focuses on the day-to-day events at St Oswald's as the situation develops. The second is marked by a Black Pawn, and is the voice of the mysterious enemy within St Oswald's, whose identity is only revealed  at the end of the book, and who, little by little, reveals the bitterness and hatred that drives a person to fake an identity, break the law and even to commit murder - all in the name of revenge.

Characters in Gentlemen & Players
Roy Straitley – unmarried Classics master, called "Quaz" by his pupils. Highly intelligent, defiantly old-fashioned, very observant, devoted to his pupils and the School, he is totally unambitious, dislikes being told what to do, despises all innovations in teaching and has the habit of swearing in Latin at people who don't know the language.
Pat Bishop – the Second Master, also unmarried, a keen sportsman devoted to St Oswald's.
Bob Strange – the Third Master, a bureaucrat unpopular with the pupils; ambitious, narrow-minded and unscrupulous.
Geoff and Penny Nation – a married couple, part of the German department.
Gerry Grachvogel – a “well-meaning ass with a predilection for flashcards.”
Dr ‘Sourgrape’ Devine – Head of Department, with no interest in Classics.
Tony Beard – head of computer science.
Isabelle Tapi – a part-time French teacher, "rather useless in a leggy, Gallic kind of way"
Jeff Light – a Games master. Boorish and lazy.
Chris Keane – a young man who teaches English but wants to be a novelist.
Dianne Dare – an attractive young woman who teaches French.
The New Head: headmaster of St Oswald's. A born administrator, still referred to as the "New Head" by Straitley, even though he has been at St Oswald's for fifteen years.

Major themes
Apart from the thrilling plot, Gentlemen and Players offers rich food for thought. Firstly, there is ample discussion of the teaching profession—its pros and cons, its beauty and its dangers. For example, in the novel a male teacher is accused by a malicious pupil, who only wants to divert attention from the student's own truancy, of having an affair with a 15-year-old girl. The ploy works, the unpleasant teacher is suspended and never seen again ("Mud sticks."). On a different note, in recent years the paradox has cropped up of having to view pupils as "paying customers" whose wishes have to be respected at all times and at the same time as individuals in their formative years who must not only be encouraged and praised but also punished for their misbehaviour.

Secondly, the novel gives an insight into the power structure which dominates a large institution of learning, where an individual teacher can never be sure whether a perceived attack on his own well-being has happened out of malice or sheer stupidity, or a combination of both. Siding with the winners or those in power to prevent such nuisances from happening or to advance one's own career is only one of the many human weaknesses which are on display in a professional environment where teamwork is actually supposed to be a prerequisite.

Finally, Gentlemen and Players highlights class differences and class consciousness in Britain at the turn of the millennium. Compared to the pupils at the local comprehensive, the boys attending St Oswald's are a privileged group. In their world, if there is peer pressure, it is to fit in, learn and succeed rather than to misbehave, ridicule ambition and eventually drop out.

More about

"Gentlemen and Players" is a reference to class differences and snobbery. In cricket, the Gentlemen v Players game was a first-class cricket match regularly played from 1806 until 1962 between a team made up of elite amateurs (the "Gentlemen"), young sportsmen of independent means (from the Universities), and one made up of professionals (the "Players"). Until the Sixties, Gentlemen and Players had separate changing rooms and entered the grounds through separate gates (You can still see these gates at Lord's)

In Harris's novel, the enemy within St Oswald's and his opponent, Roy Straitley, are represented by chess pieces, a black pawn and a white king, as the deadly game unfolds.

Although St. Oswald's, the staff, and the pupils are imaginary, Harris was a teacher at Leeds Grammar School. Therefore there are similarities between them, especially the staff.

"Gentlemen and Players" is also the title of a short story by E. W. Hornung, starring Raffles, "the gentleman thief".

Literary significance & criticism

Narrative technique
The story is told by two alternating first person narrators. One of them is Roy Hubert Straitley, a 65-year-old Classics master who has devoted all his life to St Oswald's and who now, nearing the end of his professional career, finds himself the last surviving member of the dying breed of classics teachers. The other narrator is the perpetrator, whose identity is only revealed in the final part of the book, and whose plotting the reader is able to follow first hand. Time and again, flashbacks detail the second narrator's childhood, adolescence and young adulthood, thus giving a fully rounded picture of a deranged mind and explaining why someone should want to demolish a school's reputation and do harm to members of the staff.

Release details
2005, UK, Doubleday, Pub date 1 October 2005, hardback (First edition)
2005, UK, Corgi Audio, Pub date 2 October 2005, audio book cassette (narrated by Derek Jacobi)
2005, UK, Corgi Audio, Pub date 2 October 2005, audio book CD (narrated by Derek Jacobi)
2006, UK, Black Swan, Pub date 5 June 2006, paperback
2006, USA, William Morrow, Pub date ? Jan 2006, hardback
2006, USA, Thorndike Press, Pub date 20 April 2006, hardback
2007, USA, HarperCollins, Pub date ? 2007, paperback

See also

 School and university in literature
 An incomplete list of mystery novels.

References
The Joanne Harris Website
Independent review of Books

External links
 A link to various reviews of the novel (Caveat lector: The review by Mario Bruzzone in the San Francisco Chronicle gives away the whole plot of the book, including its twist ending, so it will be best to avoid even skimming it before finishing the book.)
 A reading guide
 A short history of English cricket

2005 British novels
British mystery novels
Novels by Joanne Harris
Doubleday (publisher) books
Novels set in elementary and primary schools